Andre Victor Olsson (28 August 1903 – 3 July 1990) was a New Zealand rower who won two medals representing his country at the 1930 British Empire Games.

Early life and family
Born in Picton on 28 August 1903, Olsson was the son of Victor Olsson and Christina Olsson (née McKay). He married Ivy Ethel Julia Chapman on 31 January 1935.

Rowing
A member of the Picton Rowing Club, Olsson was described as "a rower of tremendous strength and stamina". He was selected in the New Zealand eight for the 1928 Olympic Games, but they did not travel because of insufficient funds.

Competing for New Zealand at the 1930 British Empire Games in Hamilton, Ontario, he won a silver medal as a member of the men's eight that lost to the English crew by three-quarters of a length. Also at the Hamilton games, he won the bronze medal in the coxless four, alongside Berry Johnson, Alex Ross and Charles Saunders.

In April 1932, Olsson was named in the New Zealand team to compete at the Olympic Games in Los Angeles. However, the following month he withdrew, and was replaced by Noel Pope.

Death
Olsson died on 3 July 1990, and he was buried at Picton Cemetery.

References

1903 births
1990 deaths
Rowers from Picton, New Zealand
New Zealand male rowers
Rowers at the 1930 British Empire Games
Commonwealth Games silver medallists for New Zealand
Commonwealth Games bronze medallists for New Zealand
Commonwealth Games medallists in rowing
Burials at Picton Cemetery
20th-century New Zealand people
Medallists at the 1930 British Empire Games